Joseph Warren Matthews (1812August 27, 1862) was an American politician who served as Governor of Mississippi from 1848 to 1850.

Biography
Matthews was born near Huntsville, Alabama. During early adulthood, he came to Mississippi as a government surveyor, engaged in laying out the newly purchased Indian lands. Soon after the Chickasaw purchase, he relocated to Marshall County Mississippi, near the now extinct town of Salem, to become a farmer. His plantation, which contained about  actually touched the western boundary of the Chickasaw Cession. The southeast corner of Matthews' plantation is the northwest corner of the modern Village of Snow Lake. This portion of Tippah County was split to form a new county, Benton County.

In 1840, he was elected representative to the legislature from Marshall County, and was senator from that county from 1844 to 1848. On June 7, 1847 the Democratic State Convention nominated Matthews for governor on the third ballot by a majority of fifty-one of twenty-seven for the other candidates.  Matthews won the gubernatorial election over the Whig candidate, Major A.H. Bradford, also of Marshall County, by a vote of 26,985 to 13,997.

Mathews was a plain-spoken man, and was derided by the aristocratic Whigs for his humble beginnings.  A surveyor, he worked for a time as a young man as a well digger, thus earning him the derisive nickname, "Old Copperas Britches."

During his administration, the state adopted a new legal code, established an institution for the blind, and the University of Mississippi opened for its first session in the fall of 1848. The Jackson-Brandon railroad also began operation, and telegraph service became available in Jackson and other parts of the state.

In 1862, Matthews accepted a commission in the Confederate army, but died in transit at Palmetto, Georgia.  There is a large monument to Matthews located in the Matthews family cemetery on his former plantation. This monument is in a wooded area approximately  due north from the intersection of Hoover Road and Bonds Loop, and is not visible from the road. It was placed by the Sons of Confederate Veterans.

References

External links
 Short Biography of Joseph W. Matthews

1812 births
1862 deaths
Democratic Party governors of Mississippi
American planters
19th-century American politicians
People from Huntsville, Alabama